Tarboro is an unincorporated community located in Jasper County, South Carolina, United States. It is near the southern terminus of U.S. 601 at its junction with U.S. 321.

References

Unincorporated communities in Jasper County, South Carolina
Unincorporated communities in South Carolina
Hilton Head Island–Beaufort micropolitan area